Club Deportivo L'Alcora (sometimes spelled as Club Deportivo Alcora) is a Spanish football team based in L'Alcora, in the Valencian Community. Founded in 1967, it plays in Regional Preferente – Group 1, holding home matches at Campo Municipal El Saltador, with a capacity of 1,500 people.

History

Club background
Agrupación Deportiva La Salle de Alcora (1967–1970)
Club Deportivo Alcora (1970–1999)
Club Deportivo L'Alcora (1999–present)

Season to season

References

External links
Soccerway team profile

Football clubs in the Valencian Community
Association football clubs established in 1967
1967 establishments in Spain
Province of Castellón